Andre Ronald Savage (born May 27, 1975) is a Canadian former professional ice hockey centre who played 66 games in the National Hockey League (NHL) between the Boston Bruins and the Philadelphia Flyers. He completed his professional career in Germany with the Thomas Sabo Ice Tigers of the Deutsche Eishockey Liga (DEL).

Playing career
Savage played collegiate hockey with the Michigan Tech Huskies of the Western Collegiate Hockey Association. At the completion of his senior season and having gone undrafted in the NHL Entry Draft he signed with the Boston Bruins as a free agent in 1998 and spent three seasons splitting his time between Boston and the Providence Bruins. He signed with the Vancouver Canucks in 2001, but spent the entire season with the club's American Hockey League affiliate in the Manitoba Moose .  He then signed with the Philadelphia Flyers in 2002 where he played 16 games.  It would be Savage's last season in the NHL as he spent the rest of his Flyers spell with the Philadelphia Phantoms and was loaned back to the Providence Bruins in 2003.

On July 22, 2004, he signed a one-year contract with the Colorado Avalanche, but he never played for the Avalanche thanks to the NHL lockout. Instead he played in the AHL with the Avalanche's affiliate in the Hershey Bears before being loaned out to the San Antonio Rampage.

In 2005, Savage embarked on a career abroad and moved to Sweden, signing with the Malmö Redhawks in the second tier HockeyAllsvenskan for one season before moving to the Sinupret Ice Tigers in Germany's Deutsche Eishockey Liga. He retired from professional hockey upon completing his fourth season with the Ice Tigers in 2009–10.

Career statistics

Awards and honors

References

External links
 

1975 births
Living people
Boston Bruins players
Canadian ice hockey centres
Hershey Bears players
Malmö Redhawks players
Manitoba Moose players
Michigan Tech Huskies men's ice hockey players
Philadelphia Flyers players
Philadelphia Phantoms players
Providence Bruins players
San Antonio Rampage players
Sinupret Ice Tigers players
Thomas Sabo Ice Tigers players
Ice hockey people from Ottawa
Undrafted National Hockey League players
Canadian expatriate ice hockey players in Germany
Canadian expatriate ice hockey players in Sweden